Dave Anthony Magazu (June 10, 1957 - December 17, 2021) was an offensive line coach and a tight ends coach with the Carolina Panthers, Denver Broncos, Chicago Bears, and Birmingham Iron.

Early years 

Dave Magazu was born in Taunton, Massachusetts to Damon Magazu and Carole Magazu.

References

1957 births
2021 deaths
People from Taunton, Massachusetts
Carolina Panthers coaches
Denver Broncos coaches
Chicago Bears coaches
Birmingham Iron coaches
Springfield College (Massachusetts) alumni